The SNCF Class BB 27000 "Prima" electric locomotives were built by Alstom between 2001–2005. These are dual-voltage freight-only locomotives; they are not fitted with a 1500 V DC electrical line for train heating and accessories. One hundred and eighty of the locomotives, numbered 27001–27180, were built for Fret SNCF, for use on freight traffic. Their introduction led to the withdrawal of several elderly electric types, including Classes CC 7000, CC 7100, BB 8100 and BB 12000. They have also made significant inroads into Classes CC 6500, BB 8500, BB 16500 and BB 25500.

They can be seen largely in North and Eastern France and the lines through Dijon to Lyon, and the lines to Rouen and Caen.

Names
 27001 - Port Autonome de Marseille
 27062 - Méricourt

External links
 SNCF - Série BB 27000

27000
Alstom Prima electric locomotives
Bo′Bo′ locomotives
1500 V DC locomotives
25 kV AC locomotives
Standard gauge electric locomotives of France
Railway locomotives introduced in 2002
Multi-system locomotives

Freight locomotives